Ha Geun-chan was (Hangul: 하근찬) an early modern South Korean writer.

Life
Ha Geun-chan was born on October 21, 1931 in Yeongcheon, Gyeongsangbuk-do and died on November 25, 2007. At the time Korea was under Japanese colonial rule. Ha was the eldest son of Ha Jae-jung and Bak Yeon-hak. His primary and secondary education was under the aegis of the Japanese "naisen ittai" movement, an attempt by the Japanese colonial government to create Japanese citizens out of Korean ones. In fact, not uncommonly, he did not learn Korean in earnest until he entered higher education, in this case a teacher's college. Ha passed his teacher-licensing exam and began teaching elementary school. Ha entered Dong-a University, but did not complete his studies, and after serving his military service in 1958, began a career as a writer.

Work

Although Ha Geun-chan is a writer who belongs to the “postwar generation,” his literary concern does not include urban devastation or the consciousness of petit-bourgeois as shaped in the aftermath of the war, which characterize other works of fiction from that generation. Rather, he uses rural landscape and simple-hearted country folk to shed light on another dimension of the Korean War's traumatic impact on Korean people. “Suffering of Two Generations” presents a man who lost an arm during World War II and his only son, who returns home from the Korean War, having lost his leg. Yet the simplicity of the man and his son, who accept their tragedy as a fate to be overcome, affirms the possibility of rejuvenation. In “Excrement” (Bun), a mother empties her bowels in the township office for not exempting her son from military conscription. In “The Royal Tombs and Occupying Forces,” (Wangneunggwa judungun) a dedicated tomb keeper, who tries to protect the sacred grounds from being used as a site for prostitution, is horrified to discover that his only daughter has had sexual relations with foreign soldiers. At times comical and even obtuse, Ha Geunchan's characters nonetheless possess the strength of will to survive, the heartiness to endure and the regenerative spirit rooted in simple faith. The author maintains a sympathetic attitude towards his subjects without drifting towards sentimentality.

Works in Translation
 The suffering of Two Generations (2013)
 The Spring Song, Ill-Fated Father and Son, The Color of Mugwort, in Two Travellers.

Works in Korean (Partial)
Novels 
 Chamber Pot (Yaho, 1972)
 A Short Biography of Wollye (Wollye sojeon, 1978)
 Mountains and Plains (Sane deure, 1984)
 Little Dragon (Jaggeun yong, 1989).

Awards
 Korean Literature Award (1970)
 Yosan Literature Award (1984)

References

External links
 Review of "The Suffering of Two Generations" (Ill-Fated Father and Son) in Two Travelers at KTLIT.

1931 births
South Korean writers
People from Yeongcheon
2007 deaths
Dong-a University alumni